Monelytrum is a monotypic genus of grass in the family Poaceae. Its sole species, Monelytrum luederitzianum (commonly known in English as Lüderitz grass) is  endemic to Namibia. Both common and scientific names were named for the city of Lüderitz, located in the far south of Namibia.

References

External links
Grassbase - The World Online Grass Flora

Chloridoideae
Flora of Namibia
Monotypic Poaceae genera
Taxa named by Eduard Hackel